The  was a 203 mm rocket mortar used by the Imperial Japanese Army in the final stages of World War II.

Development and design
During World War II there was considerable infighting between the Imperial Japanese Army and the Imperial Japanese Navy as both competed for scarce resources.  A consequence of this competition is that each produced similar but different weapons.  An example of this competition was the Army Type 4 20 cm rocket launcher and the 20 cm Naval Rocket Launcher.

The Type 4 rocket mortar was developed in the final stages of World War II by the Japanese Army Technical Bureau, as a low-cost, easy to produce weapon, which had an advantage of greater accuracy over conventional mortars.  The Type 4 rocket used a double base solid-propellant whose exhaust gasses were forced through six venturis drilled in the base of the rocket which spin-stabilized the projectile.  The rocket used trinitroanisole explosives and was nose fuzed.

The first units were deployed in 1943, and were used successfully in combat during the Battle of Iwo Jima and Battle of Okinawa. Due to its ease of construction and portability, the Type 4 was produced in large numbers and distributed to hidden arsenals for use as last-ditch weapons during the projected Allied invasion of the Japanese home islands.

Although the weapon came with a standard mortar tube with tripod mounting, if necessary, the rocket-propelled round could be launched from an ordinary pipe or culvert with sufficient diameter, wooden rails, or even directly from a slope in the ground.

Photo Gallery

References
 Bishop, Chris (eds) The Encyclopedia of Weapons of World War II. Barnes & Nobel. 1998. 
 Chamberlain, Peter and Gander, Terry. Heavy Field Artillery. Macdonald and Jane's (1975). 
 Chant, Chris. Artillery of World War II, Zenith Press, 2001, 
 McLean, Donald B. Japanese Artillery; Weapons and Tactics. Wickenburg, Ariz.: Normount Technical Publications 1973. .
 US Department of War, TM 30-480, Handbook on Japanese Military Forces, Louisiana State University Press, 1994.

External links
 Type 4 on Taki's Imperial Japanese Army page

Notes

4
Rocket artillery
203 mm artillery
Weapons and ammunition introduced in 1943